This is a list of lists of superheroes in fiction:

By ethnicity or nationality
 List of Asian superheroes
 List of black superheroes
 List of Filipino superheroes
 List of Italian superheroes
 List of Jewish superheroes
 List of Latino superheroes
 List of Native American superheroes
 List of Russian superheroes
 List of United States-themed superheroes

Other
 List of animal superheroes
 List of child superheroes
 List of deaf superheroes
 List of superheroines
 List of superhero teams and groups

See also

 List of heroes (disambiguation)
 Lists of villains